Stefania Calegari (born 22 March 1967) is an Italian former ice dancer. She competed with Pasquale Camerlengo for around ten years. They won gold medals at the 1990 Skate America, 1990 Grand Prix International de Paris, and 1991 Skate Canada International, a silver medal at the 1992 Nations Cup, and bronze medals at the 1990 and 1991 NHK Trophy. In 1992, they achieved their highest results at the European Championships and World Championships, placing fourth at both events. They also competed at the 1992 Winter Olympics and finished fifth.

Results
(ice dance with Pasquale Camerlengo)

References

 Skatabase: 1990s Olympics
 Skatabase: 1980s Worlds
 Skatabase: 1990s Worlds
 Skatabase: 1980s Europeans
 Skatabase: 1990s Europeans

Italian female ice dancers
Olympic figure skaters of Italy
Figure skaters at the 1992 Winter Olympics
Living people
People from Sesto San Giovanni
1967 births
21st-century Italian dancers
20th-century Italian dancers
20th-century Italian women
21st-century Italian women
Sportspeople from the Metropolitan City of Milan